Smuggler Cove Marine Provincial Park is a provincial park in British Columbia, Canada.

Smuggler Cove is a small, picturesque all-weather anchorage on the south side of Sechelt Peninsula near Secret Cove. To access this park by land, visitors can hike 4 km from a parking lot off Hwy 101. This park provides hiking, swimming, kayaking and picnicking. Park Size: 185 hectares. 16 km West of Sechelt on the Sunshine Coast. Accessible by boat from the north end of Welcome Pass. Also accessible from Brooks Road off Hwy 101 halfway between Secret Cove and Halfmoon Bay on the Sunshine Coast. It is a 4 km hike from the parking lot to Smuggler Cove.
The Smuggler Cove Marine Provincial Park draws many boaters and sightseers every year to the protected cove. Many come to explore the many bays of the area, rock cliffs and beach areas. The marine park is considered a wetland park so there are some very sensitive ecological areas along the path designed to protect the ecosystem. Please stay on walking paths and have dogs leashed.

Smuggler Cove is an all-weather anchorage with three large anchoring basins for cruising boats. The best entry to the park by boat is through Welcome Passage at low tide when reef and rock projections are visible. The local area has provided many eye bolts located along the shoreline to accommodate stern pins.

History

A possible apocryphal story is that Smuggler Cove owes its name to its reported use by Larry Kelly.  Kelly, the “King of the Smugglers” who was also known as “Pirate” came up to Canada after fighting for the confederates in the American Civil War.  When the Canadian Pacific Railway was completed, many unemployed Chinese workers tried to emigrate to the United States but were forbidden official entry.  Kelly assisted the Chinese to cross the border for a fee of $100 each.  His insurance against detection was to have the Chinese agree to be roped together and tied to a large hunk of pig iron.  If there was a chance that they would be apprehended by U.S. customs, he would throw the iron and Chinese overboard. Common misconception is that Larry Kelly was also nicknamed "Pig Iron," but this was another smuggler by the name of Jim Kelly.

Gallery

References

https://web.archive.org/web/20080605065800/http://www.env.gov.bc.ca/bcparks/explore/parkpgs/smuggler.html

External links

Smuggler Cove Hiking Trails

Provincial parks of British Columbia
Sunshine Coast Regional District
Protected areas established in 1971
1971 establishments in British Columbia
Marine parks of Canada